Beans is a 2020 Canadian drama film directed by Mohawk-Canadian filmmaker Tracey Deer. It explores the 1990 Oka Crisis at Kanesatake, which Deer lived through as a child, through the eyes of Tekehentahkhwa (nicknamed "Beans"), a young Mohawk girl whose perspective on life is radically changed by these events.

The film premiered at the 2020 Toronto International Film Festival, where it was second runner up for the People's Choice Award. It was also featured at the 2021 New York International Children's Film Festival, among others.

The film won the Canadian Screen Award for Best Picture at the 9th Canadian Screen Awards in 2021, along with the John Dunning Best First Feature Film Award. It was nominated for the Prix Iris for Best Screenplay at the 24th Quebec Cinema Awards in 2022.

Plot
Tekehentahkhwa, who goes by the nickname "Beans", is a bright preteen who lives in Kahnawake, a Mohawk reserve. She is encouraged by her mother, Lily, to try to apply for a prestigious, predominantly white school in Montreal, something her father opposes.

After seeing their cousin Karahwen'hawi on TV protesting the expansion of a golf course into Kahnesatake territory upriver, the entire family drives to the area to support the protestors. The Mohawk land is surrounded by the town of Oka, Quebec, which was seeking to expand its golf course into a historic Mohawk cemetery. Beans and her little sister are quickly caught up in a police raid, which strengthens her parents' resolve to stay and help during the protest. Tensions grow fast. Barricades are built and the Kahnesatake territory is isolated. Food runs short and women and children are given the possibility to evacuate. Outside, protesters throw rocks at the evacuating cars.

In the meantime, Beans befriends April, an older girl she seeks to emulate in smoking, cursing, and friendships with boys. April teaches Beans to toughen up, in a hard way.

The army is brought in to replace local police as tensions rise among protesters and the military. Beans, her younger sister Ruby, and her mother Lily are relocated to a nearby hotel with other Mohawk women and children from the community. Beans attends a party in the hotel with April and some older teens, where Beans drinks alcohol and has her first kiss with April's older brother. In the hotel lobby, Beans starts a fight with a white girl around her same age, causing Beans and her family to be removed from the hotel. 

Beans, Ruby, Lily, April, and April's brother return home by sneaking through the barricade, just as Lily is about to give birth. As Lily is in labor, beans attends a campfire with April and her friends. April's brother takes Beans aside and asks for a blowjob, then becomes aggressive when Beans refuses. When Beans goes to April for help, April implies that her father (and possibly her brother) has been sexually abusing her. Beans returns home, where her mother has given birth safely.     

Some time later, Beans helps April sneak out of her father's place so April can move in with her grandmother. Beans and her family meet with Hawi, who declares that an agreement has been reached, protecting the native burial ground and preventing the golf course expansion. Beans starts at the prestigious private school, proudly introducing herself  as Tekehentahkhwa.

Cast

 Kiawentiio as Beans/Tekehentahkhwa
 Rainbow Dickerson as Lily
 Violah Beauvais as Ruby
 Paulina Alexis as April
 D'Pharaoh Woon-A-Tai as Hank

Production
The semi-autobiographical story is based on historic events that Deer lived through as a child. While she includes harsh events, she has said she wanted to avoid having the film be traumatic for viewers. It is recommended for viewers of 14+ in age. Filming took place in Kahnawake and Montreal in 2019.

Deer began writing the script in 2012, in collaboration with Meredith Vuchnich. It was a long, seven-year process, partly because revisiting the Oka Crisis brought up difficult memories. She sought therapy to help her deal with them.

Release
Beans had its world premiere at the 2020 Toronto International Film Festival in September 2020.

Reception

Critical response
The site's critical consensus reads, "Beans opens a compelling window into the indigenous coming-of-age experience -- and serves as an affecting debut for Kiawentiio."

The film was named to TIFF's year-end Canada's Top Ten list for feature films.

Accolades

References

External links
 
 
 Beans at Library and Archives Canada

Films set in Quebec
Films shot in Montreal
2020 films
2020s English-language films
English-language Canadian films
First Nations films
Canadian coming-of-age drama films
Films directed by Tracey Deer
Drama films based on actual events
Mohawk culture
2020s coming-of-age drama films
Best First Feature Genie and Canadian Screen Award-winning films
Best Picture Genie and Canadian Screen Award winners
2020s Canadian films